Orlando Palmeiro (born January 19, 1969) is a former Major League Baseball outfielder. He attended high school at Miami Southridge High School and played college baseball at the University of Miami.

Palmeiro, a star high school player in Miami, Florida, went on to play baseball at the community college level at Miami-Dade Community College South and then briefly at the University of Miami under UM coach Ron Fraser before being drafted by the California Angels where he played for a number of years on various farm teams before reaching the majors.

Palmeiro spent his entire career as a backup outfielder, never having been a regular starter. He was the fourth outfielder of the 2002 World Series Champion Anaheim Angels team, batting .300 for the year. Palmeiro also made the last out of the 2005 World Series for the Houston Astros. His best season was arguably with the St. Louis Cardinals in 2003, when he batted .271 with 3 home runs and 33 RBI. He is the cousin of Rafael Palmeiro.

See also

List of Cuban Americans

References

External links

1969 births
Living people
Anaheim Angels players
California Angels players
Houston Astros players
Major League Baseball designated hitters
Major League Baseball outfielders
Baseball players from New Jersey
Miami Hurricanes baseball players
St. Louis Cardinals players
Sportspeople from Hoboken, New Jersey
American expatriate baseball players in Canada
Boise Hawks players
Midland Angels players
Quad Cities River Bandits players
Vancouver Canadians players
Miami Southridge Senior High School alumni